Leon Max (born Leonid Maksovich Rodovinsky; ; 12 February 1954) is a Russian-American fashion designer and retailer.

Early life
Max was born in Leningrad, Soviet Union (now Saint Petersburg), in 1954. He then sought political asylum to Vienna on his way to Israel. He later enrolled at the Fashion Institute of Technology in New York City. He became a naturalized United States citizen in 1986, at which time he legally changed his name to Leon Max.

Career
He worked as a personal trainer in New York. He then worked for the New York fashion house Tahari, and then Los Angeles-based Bis, a women’s sportswear firm.

He founded Max Studio in 1979. An upmarket fashion chain, Max Studio sells through department stores. It also has 46 of its own retail stores in the U.S. and another 50 in the Far East.

In July 2012, he received an honorary degree from the University of Northampton.

Personal life
He was divorced twice. His second wife was Ame Austin, an American model and stylist. In 2014, he married Yana Boyko, a Ukrainian model.

In 2005, he purchased Easton Neston in Northamptonshire, England from Lord Hesketh.  He converted the 10,000 sq ft of the fire damaged Wren wing of the house, plus the out buildings which were the home of defunct Formula One team Hesketh Racing into a design studio. The interior design was done by Lady Henrietta Spencer-Churchill. In July 2011, a party was thrown at Easton Neston to celebrate the completion of its renovation. It was hosted by Richard Dennen, Mary Charteris and Josephine de La Baume.

In 2010, he purchased a house formerly owned by Madonna in the Hollywood Hills, near the Hollywood Sign in Los Angeles, California.

According to The Sunday Times in 2020, Max has a net worth of £410 million.

References

External links
 MaxStudio

Living people
1954 births
People from West Northamptonshire District
People from Los Angeles
American fashion designers
Fashion Institute of Technology alumni
Soviet emigrants to the United States
American people of Russian-Jewish descent